Zamarada exigua is a geometer moth species first described by David Stephen Fletcher in 1974. Its name has only been provisionally accepted. It is found in both the Congo and Uganda.

References

Abraxini
Moths described in 1974
Insects of Uganda
Insects of the Democratic Republic of the Congo
Moths of Africa